Dulab (also Romanized as Dūlāb) is a village in Deh Kahan Rural District, Aseminun District, Manujan County, Kerman Province, Iran. At the 2006 census, its population was 237, in 47 families.

References 

Populated places in Manujan County